The Challenger 24 is a Canadian sailboat that was designed by Alex McGruer and first built in 1973.

Production
The design was built by Challenger Yachts in Canada, but it is now out of production.

Design

The Challenger 24 is a recreational keelboat, built predominantly of fibreglass, with wood trim. It has a masthead sloop rig, a raked stem, a vertical transom, an internally mounted spade-type rudder controlled by a tiller and a fixed fin keel. It displaces  and carries  of ballast.

The boat is normally fitted with a small outboard motor for docking and maneuvering, although the design originally specified an inboard Renault diesel engine.

The accommodation includes a forward "V"-berth, a semi-private head, a convertible dinette table that can be used as a berth and a quarter-berth aft.

Variants
Challenger 7.4 and 7.5
Model built from 1974 to 1980, with 800 examples completed. Otherwise similar to the Challenger 24.

Operational history
In a review Michael McGoldrick wrote, "it is one of those sailboats which attempts to provide full standing headroom in the cabin for the least possible money. It may not be the best built, or nicest looking, or the fastest sailboat around, but it's probably one of the least expensive model that can be found on the used market with standing headroom."

See also

List of sailing boat types

Similar sailboats
Achilles 24
Atlantic City catboat
Balboa 24
C&C 24
C&C SR 25
Columbia 24
Dana 24
Islander 24
Islander 24 Bahama
J/24
MacGregor 24
Mirage 24
Northern 1/4 Ton
Nutmeg 24
San Juan 24
Seidelmann 245
Shark 24

References

External links

Keelboats
1980s sailboat type designs
Sailing yachts
Sailboat type designs by Alex McGruer
Sailboat types built by Challenger Yachts